Bonia is a genus of Chinese and Vietnamese bamboos in the grass family.

Species
 Bonia amplexicaulis (L.C.Chia, H.L.Fung & Y.L.Yang) N.H.Xia – Guangxi
 Bonia levigata (L.C.Chia, H.L.Fung & Y.L.Yang) N.H.Xia – Hainan
 Bonia parvifloscula (W.T.Lin) N.H.Xia – Guangdong 
 Bonia saxatilis (L.C.Chia, H.L.Fung & Y.L.Yang – Guangdong, Guangxi
 Bonia tonkinensis Balansa – Vietnam

References

Bambusoideae
Bambusoideae genera
Flora of China
Flora of Vietnam
Taxa named by Benjamin Balansa